Karen Shinkins (born 15 October 1976 in Newbridge, County Kildare) is a retired Irish sprinter who specialised in the 400 metres. She represented her country at the 2000 Summer Olympics, as well as four consecutive World Championships, starting in 1999.

She has personal bests of 51.07 (1999) outdoors and 51.58 indoors (2002). The latter is still the national record.

Competition record

References

1976 births
Living people
Irish female sprinters
Athletes (track and field) at the 2000 Summer Olympics
Olympic athletes of Ireland
World Athletics Championships athletes for Ireland
People from Newbridge, County Kildare
Sportspeople from County Kildare
Olympic female sprinters